Yolŋu Matha, meaning the 'Yolŋu tongue', is a linguistic family that includes the languages of the Yolngu (also known as the Yolŋu and Yuulngu languages), the indigenous people of northeast Arnhem Land in northern Australia. The ŋ in Yolŋu is pronounced as the ng in singing.

Varieties
Yolŋu Matha consists of about six languages, some mutually intelligible, divided into about thirty clan varieties and perhaps twelve different dialects, each with its own Yolŋu name. Put together, there are about 4600 speakers of Yolŋu Matha languages. Exogamy has often meant that mothers and fathers speak different languages, so that children traditionally grew up at least bilingual, and in many cases polylingual, meaning that communication was facilitated by mastery of multiple languages and dialects of Yolŋu Matha. The linguistic situation is very complicated, given that each of the 30 or so clans also has a named language variety. Dixon (2002) distinguishes the following:

Bowern (2011) adds the varieties in parentheses as distinct languages.

Phonology

Consonants

The consonant inventory is basically the same across Yolŋu varieties, although some varieties show minor differences.

Yolŋu languages have a fortis–lenis contrast in plosive consonants. Lenis/short plosives have weak contact and intermittent voicing, while fortis/long plosives have full closure, a more powerful release burst, and no voicing.

Vowels

A three-way vowel distinction is shared between Yolŋu varieties, though not all Yolŋu varieties have a contrast in length. In the varieties that do have a length contrast, long vowels occur only in the initial syllable of words.

In popular culture
The films Ten Canoes (2006) and Charlie's Country (2013), both directed by Rolf de Heer and featuring actor David Gulpilil, feature dialogue in Yolŋu Matha.  Ten Canoes was the first feature film to be shot entirely in Australian indigenous languages, with the dialogue largely in the Ganalbiŋu variety of Yolŋu Matha.

Dr. G. Yunupingu was a popular Australian singer who sang in the Gumatj dialect of Yolŋu Matha, as did the Aboriginal rock group Yothu Yindi.

Baker Boy, from the community of Milingimbi in North Eastern Arnhem Land released the song "Cloud 9" in 2017, in which he raps in Yolŋu Matha. As Young Australian of the Year in 2019, the International Year of Indigenous Languages, and with two of his songs in the 2019 Triple J Hottest 100, he raised the profile of Yolŋu Matha in mainstream media as well as giving people at home pride in their language.

Dictionaries and resources

Dictionaries have been produced by Beulah Lowe, David Zorc and Michael Christie. A free, web-based searchable dictionary created by John Greatorex was launched in February 2015 by Charles Darwin University.

There are also several grammars of Yolŋu languages by Jeffrey Heath, Frances Morphy, Melanie Wilkinson and others.

A graduate certificate in Yolŋu studies is offered at Charles Darwin University, teaching Yolŋu kinship, law and the Gupapuyŋu language variety.

ABC Indigenous News Radio broadcasts a news program in Yolngu Matha and also in Warlpiri on weekdays. The Aboriginal Resource and Development Services (ARDS) broadcast live radio in northeast Arnhem Land, Darwin and Palmerston and provide recordings of past programs on the internet.

Words and expressions

  'skill, talent, ability'
 Bäru 'crocodile'
  'with water' (bucket with water), 'watery'.
  'good, OK'
  or Yo (pronounced 'yo') 'yes'
 Yo manymak when used together the expression can be synonymous with either of its two component words and also used as a friendly greeting, the 'o' in yo is usually held for longer when used as part of this expression.
  'no'
  'child'
  ‘sister’
  'big'
  denotes the link between two different entities which is characterised as a mother-child relationship.

Austronesian loanwords

Like other languages of the Top End, Yolŋu-Matha contains many loanwords from Austronesian languages due to abundant contact with seafaring peoples from the Indonesian archipelago. Walker and Zorc have identified 179 Yolŋu-Matha words that are clearly of Austronesian origin, and have identified a further 70 possible Austronesian loanwords requiring further study.

Vocabulary
Capell (1942) lists the following basic vocabulary items:

Notes

References
 Yolngu.net: grammar, vocabulary, history 
 Aboriginal Resource and Development Services (ARDS) 
 Charles Darwin University, Darwin, Yolŋu Matha course 
 ARDS Rhombuy Dhäwu: Legal English-Yolngu Matha Online Dictionary 
 Trudgen, Richard, Why Warriors Lie Down & Die , ARDS, Darwin, 2000.
 Examples of Yolngu Matha being spoken 
 Radio National story
 Watson, Helen and David Wade Chambers (with the Yolngu community at Yirrkala). Singing the Land, Signing the Land. Deakin University.
 Madayin Law in Yolngu and English

Further reading

 
Yolngu
Indigenous Australian languages in the Northern Territory